Geysar Seyfulla qizi Kashiyeva (Azerbaijani: Qeysər Kaşıyeva; 7 June 1893, Tiflis – 17 April 1972, Baku) was an Azerbaijani painter. She is considered the first professional female painter in Azerbaijani history.

Life and contributions
She was born in Tiflis, Russian Empire (now Tbilisi, the capital of Georgia) to a family of an ethnic Azeri officer of the Russian Imperial Army. In 1907–1908 she took a course in professional painting at the Caucasus Artistic Society, where she was taught by Oscar Schmerling (who later worked as caricaturist for the Azeri-language magazine Molla Nasraddin). Her first works were painted in watercolour, pencil, ink, or coal. Those include Goncharov's Portrait (1909), A Muslim Intellectual (1912), Lakeshore (1914), Baba Yaga (1915), etc. She also designed playbill and posters while working at the Muslim Women's Caucasian Benevolent Society. In 1916 she married Colonel Shirin bey Kasamanski, who was undergoing medical treatment in Tiflis after having been wounded in one of the battles during World War I. He died shortly after the war, in 1919. Their only daughter Layya later became a chemist and died in 1994.

Upon the establishment of the Azerbaijan Democratic Republic in 1918, Kashiyeva moved to Baku. After Sovietisation, she gave art lessons and worked as an illustrator for the magazine Sharg Gadini. In the 1930s she married Zulfugar Seyidbeyli, an active member of the Communist Party of Azerbaijan. In 1938 Seyidbeyli was arrested for political reasons and deported along with Kashiyeva from European Russia. She returned to Azerbaijan in the 1950s and once again engaged in artistic work. She died in 1972, at age 78. Her works are preserved in the Museum of Fine Arts in Baku.

References

1893 births
1972 deaths
Azerbaijani portrait painters
Georgian Azerbaijanis
Artists from Tbilisi
Azerbaijani women painters
Soviet painters
20th-century Azerbaijani painters
20th-century Azerbaijani women artists
Azerbaijani painters